Albert Romolo Broccoli (April 5, 1909 – June 27, 1996), nicknamed "Cubby", was an American film producer who made more than 40 motion pictures throughout his career. Most of the films were made in the United Kingdom and  often filmed at Pinewood Studios. Co-founder of Danjaq, LLC and Eon Productions, Broccoli is most notable as the producer of many of the James Bond films. He and Harry Saltzman saw the films develop from relatively low-budget origins to large-budget, high-grossing extravaganzas, and Broccoli's heirs continue to produce new Bond films.

Early life
Broccoli was born in the borough of Queens, New York City, the younger of two children of immigrants from the Calabria region of Italy, Giovanni Broccoli and Kristina Vence. He had an older brother. He acquired his nickname after his cousin, mobster Pat DiCicco, began calling him "Kabibble", after a similarly named cartoon character. This was eventually shortened to "Kubbie" and adopted by Broccoli as "Cubby". The family later bought a farm in Smithtown, New York, on Long Island, near their relatives the DiCiccos.

The family moved to Florida, and on the death of his father Giovanni, Broccoli moved to live with his grandmother in Astoria, Queens, in New York City. Having worked many jobs, including casket maker, Broccoli then became involved in the film industry. He started at the bottom, working as a gofer on Howard Hughes' The Outlaw (1941), which starred Jane Russell. Here he met his lifelong friend Howard Hughes for the first time, while Hughes was overseeing the movie's production after director Howard Hawks was fired. Broccoli rose quickly to the level of assistant director by the time the U.S. entered World War II.

Ted Healy incident 
Broccoli is alleged to have been involved in an altercation with comedian and Three Stooges creator Ted Healy outside the Trocadero nightclub, just before the latter's death in 1937. A source alleged that actor Wallace Beery, Broccoli, and film producer Pat DiCicco beat Healy so badly that he fell into a coma and died. There is no documentation in contemporaneous news reports that either Beery or DiCicco was present, allegedly because the investigation and any subsequent newspaper coverage would be routinely sidelined by the MGM studio fixers, Eddie Mannix and Howard Strickling (Mannix would later become a producer and executive for MGM), since Wallace Beery was one of MGM's most highly-paid and important actors. Beery was immediately dispatched to a long vacation in Europe until the story died down. Broccoli admitted that he was indeed involved in a fist fight with Healy at the Trocadero. He later modified his story, stating that a heavily intoxicated Healy had picked a fight with him, the two had briefly scuffled, then shook hands and parted ways. In other reports, Broccoli admitted to pushing Healy, but not striking him.

There is disagreement over whether Healy died as a result of the brawl or due to his well-known alcoholism. Because of the authorities' lack of interest in investigating Healy's death, an autopsy was not performed until after Healy's body had been embalmed, rendering the examiner's note that Healy's organs were "soaked in alcohol" useless in determining a cause of death.

Following the autopsy, the Los Angeles county coroner reported that Healy died of acute toxic nephritis secondary to acute and chronic alcoholism. Police closed their investigation, as there was no indication in the report that his death was caused by physical assault.

UK subsidy and the origins of Bond
At the beginning of the 1950s, Broccoli moved once more, this time to London, where the British government provided subsidies to film productions made in the UK with British casts and crews. Together with Irving Allen, Broccoli formed Warwick Films, which made a prolific and successful series of films for Columbia Pictures.

When Broccoli became interested in bringing Ian Fleming's James Bond character into features, he discovered that the rights already belonged to the Canadian producer Harry Saltzman, who had long wanted to break into film, and who had produced several stage plays and films with only modest success. When the two were introduced by a common friend, screenwriter Wolf Mankowitz, Saltzman refused to sell the rights, but agreed to partner with Broccoli and co-produce the films, which led to the creation of the production company EON Productions and its parent (holding) company Danjaq, LLC, named after their two wives' first names—Dana and Jacqueline.

Saltzman and Broccoli produced the first Bond film, Dr. No, in 1962. Their second, From Russia with Love, was a break-out success and from then on the films grew in cost, action, and ambition. With larger casts, more difficult stunts and special effects, and a continued dependence on exotic locations, the franchise became essentially a full-time job. Broccoli made one notable attempt at a non-Bond film, an adaptation of Ian Fleming's Chitty-Chitty-Bang-Bang in 1968, and due to legal wrangling over the rights to story elements, ceded producer credit on Thunderball to Kevin McClory. Nonetheless, by the mid-1960s, Broccoli had put nearly all of his energies into the Bond series. Saltzman's interests continued to range apart from the series, including production of a loose trilogy of spy films based on Len Deighton's Harry Palmer, a character who operates in a parallel universe to Bond, with all the danger but none of the glamour and gadgets. Saltzman and Broccoli had differences over Saltzman's outside commitments; however, in the end, it was Saltzman who withdrew from Danjaq and EON after a series of financial mishaps. While Saltzman's departure brought the franchise a step closer to corporate control, Broccoli lost relatively little independence or prestige in the bargain. From then until his death, the racy credits sequence to every EON Bond film would begin with the words "Albert R. Broccoli Presents." However, from the 1970s onward, the films became lighter in tone and looser in plot—and, at times, less successful with critics—yet, the series distinguished itself in production values and continued to appeal to audiences.

In 1966, Broccoli was in Japan with other producers scouting locations to film the next James Bond film You Only Live Twice. He had a ticket booked on BOAC Flight 911 and cancelled his ticket on that day so he could see a ninja demonstration. Flight 911 crashed due to clear-air turbulence, killing everyone on board.

Family life
Broccoli married three times. In 1940, at the age of 31, he married actress Gloria Blondell, the younger sister of Joan Blondell. They later divorced amicably in 1945 without having had children. In 1951, he married Nedra Clark, widow of the singer Buddy Clark, and the couple were told they had fertility problems and would never have children. They adopted a son, Tony Broccoli, after which Nedra became pregnant. She died in 1958, soon after giving birth to their daughter, Tina. In 1959, Broccoli married actress and novelist Dana Natol. They had a daughter, Barbara Broccoli, and Natol adopted his other two children. Albert Broccoli became a mentor to Dana's teenage son, Michael G. Wilson. The children grew up around the Bond film sets, and his wife's influence on various production decisions is alluded to in many informal accounts.

Michael Wilson worked his way up through the production company to co-write and co-produce. Barbara Broccoli, in her turn, served in several capacities under her father's tutelage from the 1980s on. Wilson and Barbara Broccoli have co-produced the films since Albert Broccoli's death.

Later life and honors

 In 1981 he was honored with the Irving G. Thalberg Memorial Award for his work in film. The award was presented at the 1982 Academy Awards ceremony by the current James Bond at that time, Roger Moore. In 1990, Broccoli also has a star on the Hollywood Walk of Fame (as Cubby Broccoli).
 A thoroughbred horse racing enthusiast, Albert Broccoli owned Brocco, who won the 1993 Breeders' Cup Juvenile at Santa Anita Park at Arcadia, California.
 An autobiography was published posthumously in 1999, titled When the Snow Melts: The Autobiography of Cubby Broccoli.
 The end of Tomorrow Never Dies (1997) displays the dedication "In loving memory of Albert R. (Cubby) Broccoli".
 The Albert and Dana Broccoli Theatre is one of three situated in the University of Southern California's School of Cinematic Arts Complex, completed in 2010.

Death
Broccoli died at his home in Beverly Hills in 1996 at the age of 87 of heart failure. He had undergone a triple heart bypass earlier that year. He was interred in an ornate sarcophagus in the outdoor Courts of Remembrance section, at Forest Lawn – Hollywood Hills Cemetery in Los Angeles following a funeral mass at The Church of the Good Shepherd, Beverly Hills.

In recognition of Broccoli's insistence that every James Bond film produced by EON should bear the name of the character's creator, Ian Fleming, in the opening credits (even when the film contained no real connection to any Fleming novel, apart from the titular character), it was decided by his surviving family that all subsequent Bond films should bear Broccoli's name. Therefore, all Bond films since Tomorrow Never Dies have opened with the line "Albert R. Broccoli's EON Productions presents".

Filmography

Producer with Harry Saltzman
 Dr. No (1962)
 From Russia with Love (1963)
 Goldfinger (1964)
 You Only Live Twice (1967)
 On Her Majesty's Secret Service (1969)
 Diamonds are Forever (1971)
 Live and Let Die (1973)
 The Man with the Golden Gun (1974)

Executive producer with Harry Saltzman
 Thunderball (1965) (produced by Kevin McClory)

Producer (solo)
 The Red Beret (1953)
 Fire Down Below (1957)
 The Trials of Oscar Wilde (1960)
 Jazz Boat (1960)
 Call Me Bwana (1963)
 Chitty Chitty Bang Bang (1968)
 The Spy Who Loved Me (1977)
 Moonraker (1979)
 For Your Eyes Only (1981)
 Octopussy (1983)

Producer with Michael G. Wilson
 A View to a Kill (1985)
 The Living Daylights (1987)
 Licence to Kill (1989)

Consulting producer
 GoldenEye (1995) (credited as presenter)

Cameos
 Fire Down Below (1957) – Drug smuggler
 Moonraker (1979) – Tourist in Venice with wife Dana Broccoli

See also

 Ian Fleming
 James Bond (character)

References

External links

 
 
 

1909 births
1996 deaths
American people of Italian descent
American racehorse owners and breeders
BAFTA winners (people)
Broccoli family
Burials at Forest Lawn Memorial Park (Hollywood Hills)
Film producers from New York (state)
James Bond
People from Queens, New York
People from Smithtown, New York